Lower Browns Tract Pond is located northeast of Inlet, New York. Fish species present in the lake are largemouth bass, smallmouth bass, brook trout, black bullhead, yellow perch, and sunfish. There is a state owned carry down in the campground off Browns Tract Road, 7 miles east of Eagle Bay. No motors are allowed on this lake.

References

Lakes of New York (state)
Lakes of Hamilton County, New York